Fürstenberg-Donaueschingen was a county of Fürstenberg that was created in 1617 as a partition of Fürstenberg-Heiligenberg. It was named after Donaueschingen and upon the extinction of the male line of counts in 1698, it was inherited by Fürstenberg-Heiligenberg.

Counts of Fürstenberg-Donaueschingen (1617–1698)
James Louis (Jakob Ludwig), Count from 1617–1627 (1592–1627)
Francis Charles (Franz Karl), Count from 1627–1698 (1626–1698)

Fürstenberg (princely family)
Counties of the Holy Roman Empire
States and territories established in 1617
1617 establishments in the Holy Roman Empire